The Country Music Association Awards is a major awards show in country music. Originally presented in 1988 as the Vocal Event of the Year Award, the Musical Event of the Year honor received its current name in 2004. The award recognizes a collaboration of two or more people, either or all of whom are known primarily as country artists.

Recipients

Category facts
Most wins

Most nominations 
Tim McGraw and Faith Hill hold the record for most collaborations, having been nominated together for this award six times, winning once in 1997.

References

Country Music Association Awards